The following lists events that happened during the 1720s in South Africa.

Events

1722
 Groot Constantia was built
 17 January - Sampson and Amstelveer, richly laden, are wrecked on the southern coast, beginning a disastrous year for Dutch ships in South Africa
 17 June - A gale lasting several days drives away ten ships lying at anchor in Table Bay harbour. All the ships sank, and 660 people lost their lives

1724
 14 February - An expedition leaves Cape Town to establish ports along the east coast. The members reach Delagoa Bay and build a fort, but are later raided by English pirates
 8 September - Jan de la Fontaine provisionally becomes Governor of the Cape Colony

1727
 25 February - Pieter Gysbert Noodt becomes Governor of the Cape

1728
 28 April - Jan de la Fontaine is again appointed provisional Governor of the Cape
 3 July - The ship Middenmark is driven on the rocks in Table Bay by a strong wind and 75 people are drowned

Deaths
 21 May 1721 - Johan Cornelis d'Ableing, acting Governor of the Cape, dies
 1724 - Olof Bergh, Swedish explorer to Namaqualand, dies in Cape Town, aged 81
 8 September 1724 - Maurits Pasques de Chavonnes, Governor of the Cape, dies
 23 April 1729 - Pieter Gysbert Noodt, Governor of the Cape, dies of a sudden heart attack at the age of 48 during the hanging of four soldiers who had deserted

References
See Years in South Africa for list of References

History of South Africa